Eucalyptus broviniensis is a species of small tree that is endemic to a small area in Queensland. It has smooth bark, lance-shaped adult leaves, flower buds arranged in groups of seven, white flowers and conical fruit.

Description
It has smooth bark, pale orange when new but fades to grey. Flowering occurs in summer and the flowers are white.

Taxonomy and naming
Eucalyptus broviniensis was first formally described in 2001 by Anthony Bean from a specimen collected near  Brovinia and the description was published in the journal Austrobaileya. The specific epithet (boliviana) refers to the type location. The ending -ensis is a Latin suffix "denoting place", "locality" or "country".

Distribution and habitat
This eucalypt grows in heath and woodland with a heathy understorey, on the edges of a plateau in the Brovinia State Forest.

See also
List of Eucalyptus species

References

Trees of Australia
broviniensis
Myrtales of Australia
Flora of Queensland
Plants described in 2001